William Ellicott (1856 – 25 April 1933) was a British sport shooter who competed at the 1908 Summer Olympics and the 1920 Summer Olympics. At the 1908 Games he won a bronze and silver medal.

References

1856 births
1933 deaths
British male sport shooters
ISSF pistol shooters
Running target shooters
Trap and double trap shooters
Olympic shooters of Great Britain
Shooters at the 1908 Summer Olympics
Shooters at the 1920 Summer Olympics
Olympic silver medallists for Great Britain
Olympic bronze medallists for Great Britain
Olympic medalists in shooting
Medalists at the 1908 Summer Olympics
English Olympic medallists
19th-century British people
20th-century British people